Editing technology is the use of technology tools in general content areas in education in order to allow students to apply computer and technology skills to learning and problem-solving. Generally speaking, the curriculum drives the use of technology and not vice versa. Technology integration is defined as the use of technology to enhance and support the educational environment. Technology integration in the classroom can also support classroom instruction by creating opportunities for students to complete assignments on the computer rather than with normal pencil and paper. In a larger sense, technology integration can also refer to the use of an integration platform and application programming interface (API) in the management of a school, to integrate disparate SaaS (Software As A Service) applications, databases, and programs used by an educational institution so that their data can be shared in real-time across all systems on campus, thus supporting students' education by improving data quality and access for faculty and staff.

"Curriculum integration with the use of technology involves the infusion of technology as a tool to enhance the learning in a content area or multidisciplinary setting... Effective integration of technology is achieved when students are able to select technology tools to help them obtain information in a timely manner, analyze and synthesize the information, and present it professionally to an authentic audience. The technology should become an integral part of how the classroom functions—as accessible as all other classroom tools. The focus in each lesson or unit is the curriculum outcome, not the technology."

Integrating technology with standard curriculum can not only give students a sense of power, but also allows for more advanced learning among broad topics. However, these technologies require infrastructure, continual maintenance and repair – one determining element, among many, in how these technologies can be used for curricula purposes and whether or not they will be successful. Examples of the infrastructure required to operate and support technology integration in schools include at the basic level electricity, Internet service providers, routers, modems, and personnel to maintain the network, beyond the initial cost of the hardware and software.

Standard education curriculum with an integration of technology can provide tools for advanced learning among a broad range of topics. Integration of information and communication technology is often closely monitored and evaluated due to the current climate of accountability, outcome-based education, and standardization in assessment.

Technology integration can in some instances be problematic. A high ratio of students to technological device has been shown to impede or slow learning and task completion. In some, instances dyadic peer interaction centered on integrated technology has proven to develop a more cooperative sense of social relations. Success or failure of technology integration is largely dependent on factors beyond the technology. The availability of appropriate software for the technology being integrated is also problematic in terms of software accessibility to students and educators. Another issue identified with technology integration is the lack of long-range planning for these tools within the educative districts they are being used.

Technology is contributes to global development and diversity in classrooms while helping to develop upon the fundamental building blocks needed for students to achieve more complex ideas. In order for technology to make an impact within the educational system, teachers and students must access to technology in a contextual matter that is culturally relevant, responsive and meaningful to their educational practice and that promotes quality teaching and active student learning.

History
The term 'educational technology' was used during the post World War II era in the United States for the integration of implements such as film strips, slide projectors, language laboratories, audio tapes, and television.  Presently, the computers, tablets, and mobile devices integrated into classroom settings for educational purposes are most often referred to as 'current' educational technologies. It is important to note that educational technologies continually change, and once referred to slate chalkboards used by students in early schoolhouses in the late nineteenth and early twentieth centuries. The phrase 'educational technology', a composite meaning of technology + education, is used to refer to the most advanced technologies that are available for both teaching and learning in a particular era.

In 1994 federal legislation for both the Educate America Act and the Improving America's School's Act (IASA) authorized funds for state and federal educational technology planning. One of the principal goals listed in the Educate America Act is to promote the research, consensus building, and systemic changes needed to ensure equitable educational opportunities and high levels of educational achievement for all students (Public Law 103-227). In 1996 the Telecommunications Act provided a systematic change necessary to ensure equitable educational opportunities of bringing new technology into the education sector. The Telecomm Act requires affordable access and service to advanced telecom services for public schools and libraries. Many of the computers, tablets, and mobile devices currently used in classrooms operate through Internet connectivity; particularly those that are application based such as tablets. Schools in high-cost areas and disadvantaged schools were to receive higher discounts in telecom services such as Internet, cable, satellite television, and the management component.

A chart of "Technology Penetration in U.S. Public Schools" report states 98% percent of schools reported having computers in the 1995–1996 school year, with 64% Internet access, and 38% working via networked systems. The ratio of students to computers in the United States in 1984 stood at 15 students per 1 computer, it now stands at an average all-time low of 10 students to computer. From the 1980s on into the 2000s, the most substantial issue to examine in educational technology was school access to technologies according to the 1997 Policy Information Report for Computers and Classrooms: The Status of Technology in U.S. Schools. These technologies included computers, multimedia computers, the Internet, networks, cable TV, and satellite technology amongst other technology-based resources.

More recently ubiquitous computing devices, such as computers and tablets, are being used as networked collaborative technologies in the classroom. Computers, tablets and mobile devices may be used in educational settings within groups, between people and for collaborative tasks. These devices provide teachers and students access to the World Wide Web in addition to a variety of software applications.

Technology education standards

National Educational Technology Standards (NETS) served as a roadmap since 1998 for improved teaching and learning by educators. As stated above, these standards are used by teachers, students, and administrators to measure competency and set higher goals to be skillful.

The Partnership for 21st Century Skills is a national organization that advocates for 21st century readiness for every student. Their most recent Technology Plan was released in 2010, "Transforming American Education: Learning Powered by Technology". This plan outlines a vision "to leverage the learning sciences and modern technology to create engaging, relevant, and personalized learning experiences for all learners that mirror students' daily lives and the reality of their futures. In contrast to traditional classroom instruction, this requires that students be put at the center and encouraged to take control of their own learning by providing flexibility on several dimensions."
Although tools have changed dramatically since the beginnings of educational technology, this vision of using technology for empowered, self-directed learning has remained consistent.

Pedagogy
The integration of electronic devices into classrooms has been cited as a possible solution to bridge access for students, to close achievement gaps, that are subject to the digital divide, based on social class, economic inequality, or gender where and a potential user does not have enough cultural capital required to have access to information and communication technologies.  Several motivations or arguments have been cited for integrating high-tech hardware and software into school, such as (1) making schools more efficient and productive than they currently are, (2) if this goal is achieved, teaching and learning will be transformed into an engaging and active process connected to real life, and (3) is to prepare the current generation of young people for the future workplace. The computer has access to graphics and other functions students can use to express their creativity. Technology integration does not always have to do with the computer. It can be the use of the overhead projector, student response clickers, etc. Enhancing how the student learns is very important in technology integration. Technology will always help students to learn and explore more.

Paradigms 

Most research in technology integration has been criticized for being atheoretical and ad hoc driven more by the affordances of the technology rather than the demands of pedagogy and subject matter. In 2012 Armstrong argued that multimedia transmission turns to limit the learning into simple content, because it is difficult to deliver complicated content through multimedia.

One approach that attempts to address this concern is a framework aimed at describing the nature of teacher knowledge for successful technology integration. The technological pedagogical content knowledge or TPACK framework has recently received some positive attention.

Another model that has been used to analyze tech integration is the SAMR framework, developed by Ruben Puentedura. This model attempts to measure the level of tech integration with the four levels that go from enhancement to transformation: substitution, augmentation, modification, and redefinition.

Constructivism 

Constructivism is a crucial component of technology integration.  It is a learning theory that describes the process of students constructing their own knowledge through collaboration and inquiry-based learning. According to this theory, students learn more deeply and retain information longer when they have a say in what and how they will learn. Inquiry-based learning, thus, is researching a question that is personally relevant and purposeful because of its direct correlation to the one investigating the knowledge.
As stated by Jean Piaget, constructivist learning is based on four stages of cognitive development. In these stages, children must take an active role in their own learning and produce meaningful works in order to develop a clear understanding. These works are a reflection of the knowledge that has been achieved through active self-guided learning. Students are active leaders in their learning and the learning is student-led rather than teacher–directed.

Many teachers use a constructivist approach in their classrooms assuming one or more of the following roles: facilitator, collaborator, curriculum developer, team member, community builder, educational leader, or information producer.

Counter argument to computers in the classroom

Is technology in the classroom needed, or does it hinder students' social development? We've all seen a table of teenagers on their phones, all texting, not really socializing or talking to each other. How do they develop social and communication skills? Neil Postman (1993) concludes: The role of the school is to help students learn how to ignore and discard information so that they can achieve a sense of coherence in their lives; to help students cultivate a sense of social responsibility; to help students think critically, historically, and humanely; to help students understand the ways in which technology shapes their consciousness; to help students learn that their own needs sometimes are subordinate to the needs of the group. I could go on for another three pages in this vein without any reference to how machinery can give students access to information. Instead, let me summarize in two ways what I mean. First, I'll cite a remark made repeatedly by my friend Alan Kay, who is sometimes called "the father of the personal computer." Alan likes to remind us that any problems the schools cannot solve without machines, they cannot solve with them. Second, and with this I shall come to a close: If a nuclear holocaust should occur some place in the world, it will not happen because of insufficient information; if children are starving in Somalia, it's not because of insufficient information; if crime terrorizes our cities, marriages are breaking up, mental disorders are increasing, and children are being abused, none of this happens because of a lack of information. These things happen because we lack something else. It is the "something else" that is now the business of schools.

Tools

Interactive whiteboards
Interactive whiteboards are used in many schools as replacements for standard whiteboards and provide a way to allow students to interact with material on the computer. In addition, some interactive whiteboards software allow teachers to record their instruction.
3D virtual environments are also used with interactive whiteboards as a way for students to interact with 3D virtual learning objects employing kinetics and haptic touch the classroom. An example of the use of this technique is the open-source project Edusim.
Research has been carried out to track the worldwide Interactive Whiteboard market by Decision Tree Consulting (DTC), a worldwide research company. According to the results, interactive Whiteboards continue to be the biggest technology revolution in classrooms, across the world there are over 1.2 million boards installed, over 5 million classrooms are forecast to have Interactive Whiteboards installed by 2011, Americas are the biggest region closely followed by EMEA, and Mexico's Enciclomedia project to equip 145,000 classrooms is worth $1.8 billion and is the largest education technology project in the world.
Interactive whiteboards can accommodate different learning styles, such as visual, tactile, and audio.

Interactive Whiteboards are another way that technology is expanding in schools. By assisting the teacher to helping students more kinestically as well as finding different ways to process there information throughout the entire classroom.

Student response systems
Student response systems consist of handheld remote control units, or response pads, which are operated by individual students. An infrared or radio frequency receiver attached to the teacher's computer collects the data submitted by students. The CPS (Classroom Performance System), once set, allows the  teacher to pose a question to students in several formats. Students then use the response pad to send their answer to the infrared sensor. Data collected from these systems is available to the teacher in real time and can be presented to the students in a graph form on an LCD projector. The teacher can also access a variety of reports to collect and analyze student data. These systems have been used in higher education science courses since the 1970s and have become popular in K-12 classrooms beginning in the early 21st century.

Audience response systems (ARS) can help teachers analyze, and act upon student feedback more efficiently. For example, with polleverywhere.com, students text in answers via mobile devices to warm-up or quiz questions. The class can quickly view collective responses to the multiple-choice questions electronically, allowing the teacher to differentiate instruction and learn where students need help most.

Combining ARS with peer learning via collaborative discussions has also been proven to be particularly effective. When students answer an in-class conceptual question individually, then discuss it with their neighbors, and then vote again on the same or a conceptually similar question, the percentage of correct student responses usually increases, even in groups where no student had given the correct answer previously.

Among other tools that have been noted as being effective as a way of technology integration are podcasts, digital cameras, smart phones, tablets, digital media, and blogs.Other examples of technology integration include translation memories and smart computerized translation programs that are among the newest integrations that are changing the field of linguistics.

Mobile learning
Mobile learning is defined as "learning across multiple contexts, through social and content interactions, using personal electronic devices".  A mobile device is essentially any device that is portable and has internet access and includes tablets, smart phones, cell phones, e-book readers, and MP3 players. As mobile devices become increasingly common personal devices of K-12 students, some educators seek to utilize downloadable applications and interactive games to help facilitate learning. This practice can be controversial because many parents and educators are concerned that students would be off-task because teachers cannot monitor their activity. This is currently being troubleshooted by forms of mobile learning that require a log-in, acting as a way to track engagement of students.

Benefits
According to findings from four meta analyses, blending technology with face-to-face teacher time generally produces better outcomes than face-to-face or online learning alone. Research is currently limited on the specific features of technology integration that improve learning. Meanwhile, the marketplace of learning technologies continues to grow and vary widely in content, quality, implementation, and context of use.

Research shows that adding technology to K-12 environments, alone, does not necessarily improve learning. What matters most to implementing mobile learning is how students and teachers use technology to develop knowledge and skills and that requires training. Successful technology integration for learning goes hand in hand with changes in teacher training, curricula, and assessment practices.

An example of teacher professional development is profiled in Edutopia's Schools That Work series on eMints, a program that offers teachers 200 hours of coaching and training in technology integration over a two-year span.  In these workshops teachers are trained in practices such as using interactive whiteboards and the latest web tools to facilitate active learning. In a 2010 publication of Learning Point Associates, statistics showed that students of teachers who had participated in eMints had significantly higher standardized test scores than those attained by their peers.

It can keep students focused for longer periods of time. The use of computers to look up information/ data is a tremendous time saver, especially when used to access a comprehensive resource like the Internet to conduct research. This time-saving aspect can keep students focused on a project much longer than they would with books and paper resources, and it helps them develop better learning through exploration and research.

Project-based activities
Definition: Project Based Learning is a teaching method in which students gain knowledge and skills by working for an extended period of time to investigate and respond to an authentic, engaging and complex question, problem, or challenge.

Project Based Activities is a method of teaching where the students gain knowledge and skills by involving themselves for the more period of time to research and respond to the engaging and complex questions, problems, or challenges. the students will work in groups to solve the problems which are challenging. The students will work in groups to solve the problems which are challenging, real, curriculum based and frequently relating to more than one branch of knowledge. Therefore, a well designed project based learning activity is one which addresses different student learning styles and which does not assume that all students can demonstrate their knowledge in a single standard way.

Elements
The project based learning activities involves four basic elements.
 An extended time frame.
 Collaboration.
 Inquiry, investigation and research.
 The construction of an artifact or performance of a consequential task.

Examples of activities

CyberHunt
The term "hunt" refers to finding or searching for something. "CyberHunt" means an online activity which learners use the internet as tool to find answers to the question's based upon the topics which are assigned by someone else. Hence learners also can design the CyberHunt on some specific topics. a CyberHunt, or internet scavenger hunt, is a project-based activity which helps students gain experience in exploring and browsing the internet. A CyberHunt may ask students to interact with the site (e.g.: play a game or watch a video), record short answers to teacher questions, as well as read and write about a topic in depth. There are basically two types of CyberHunt: 
A simple task, in which the teacher develops a series of questions and gives the students a hypertext link to the URL that will give them the answer.
A more complex task, intended for increasing and improving student internet search skills. Teachers ask questions for students to answer using a search engine.

WebQuests
It is an inquiry oriented activity in which most or all of the information used by the learners which are drawn out by the internet/web. It is designed to use  learner 'time well', to focus on using information rather than on looking for it and to support the learners to think at the level of analysis, synthesis, and evaluation. It is the wonderful way of capturing student's imagination and allowing them to explore in a guided, meaningful manner. It allow the students to explore issues and find their own answers.

There are six building blocks of webQuests:
 The introduction – capturing the student's interest.
 The task-describing the activities end product.
The resources-web sites, students will use to complete the task.
 The evaluation-measuring the result of the activity.
 The conclusion-summing up of the activity.
WebQuests are student-centered, web-based curricular units that are interactive and use Internet resources. The purpose of a webQuest is to use information on the web to support the instruction taught in the classroom. A webQuest consists of an introduction, a task (or final project that students complete at the end of the webQuest), processes (or instructional activities), web-based resources, evaluation of learning, reflection about learning, and a conclusion.

WISE 
The Web-based Inquiry Science Environment (WISE) provides a platform for creating inquiry science projects for middle school and high school students using evidence and resources from the Web. Funded by the U.S. National Science Foundation, WISE has been developed at the University of California, Berkeley from 1996 until the present. WISE inquiry projects include diverse elements such as online discussions, data collection, drawing, argument creation, resource sharing, concept mapping and other built-in tools, as well as links to relevant web resources. It is the research-focused, open-source inquiry-based learning management system that includes the student- learning environment project authoring environment, grading tool, and tool and user/ course/ content management tools.

Virtual field trip 
A virtual field trip is a website that allows the students to experience places, ideas, or objects beyond the constraints of the classroom.
A virtual field trip is a great way to allow the students to explore and experience new information. This format is especially helpful and beneficial in allowing schools to keep the cost down. Virtual field trips may also be more practical for children in the younger grades, due to the fact that there is not a demand for chaperones and supervision. Although, a virtual field trip does not allow the children to have the hands on experiences and the social interactions that can and do take place on an actual field trip. An educator should incorporate the use of hands on material to further their understanding of the material that is presented and experienced in a virtual field trip.It is a guided exploration through the www that organizes a collection of pre- screened, its thematically based web pages into a structure online  learning experience

ePortfolio 
An ePortfolio is a collection of student work that exhibits the student's achievements in one or more areas over time. Components in a typical student ePortfolio might contain creative writings, paintings, photography, math explorations, music, and videos. And it is a collection of work developed across varied contexts over time. The portfolio can advance learning by providing students and/or faculty with a way to organize, archive and display pieces of work.

References

Educational technology